Norman Rowland Gale (4 March 1862 – 7 October 1942) was a poet, novelist and reviewer, who published many books over a period of nearly fifty years.

Gale was born in Kew, Surrey. He entered Exeter College, Oxford in 1880 and graduated in 1884. He was a teacher for some years, but in 1892 he began writing full-time. His poems "Betrothed" and "The Call" appeared in The Yellow Book. His best-known poem is probably "The Country Faith", which is in The Oxford Book of English Verse. In the United States, Louis Untermeyer included it in his anthology Modern British Poetry, and, with a change of title to "Life in the Country", it opened the second reader in Cora Wilson Stewart's series, Country Life Readers.

For the last two years of his life Gale lived in Headley Down, Hampshire, where he died at the age of eighty.

Publications
 A Country Muse, 1892; reprinted with additions as A Country Muse: First Series, 1894
 A Country Muse: New Series, 1893; reprinted with additions as A Country Muse: Second Series, 1895
 Orchard Songs, 1893
 A June Romance (novel), 1894
 All Expenses Paid, 1895
 Cricket Songs, 1894
 Songs for Little People, 1896
 (ed.) Poems by John Clare, 1901
 Barty's Star (novel), 1903
 More Cricket Songs, 1905 
 A Book of Quatrains, 1909
 Song in September, 1912
 Solitude, 1913
 Collected Poems, 1914
 The Candid Cuckoo, 1918
 A Merry-go-Round of Song, 1919
 Verse in Bloom, 1925
 A Flight of Fancies, 1926
 Messrs Bat and Ball, 1930
 Close of Play, 1936
 Remembrances, 1937
 Love-in-a-Mist, 1939

References

 Who was Who

External links

 
 
Archive Material at Leeds University Library
 
 Poems by Norman Rowland Gale

1862 births
1942 deaths
Alumni of Exeter College, Oxford
English male poets
People from Kew, London